Ingram Macklin Stainback (May 12, 1883April 12, 1961) was an American politician. He served as the ninth Territorial Governor of Hawaii from 1942 to 1951.

Early life
Stainback was born in 1883 in Somerville, Tennessee. His father, Charles A. Stainback Sr, was a lawyer and his brother, Charles A. Stainback, was a Democratic member of the Tennessee Senate. 
The tombstone of Charles A. Stainback (1878-1961), is located in Somerville Cemetery, Somerville, Tennessee.

Stainback received his undergraduate degree from Princeton University and his Juris Doctor from the University of Chicago.

Career
Stainback, a well-connected Democrat, came to Hawaii shortly after graduation and was appointed by Democratic Governor Lucius E. Pinkham in 1914 to the post of Territorial Attorney General. He resigned in 1917 to join the Army and rose to the rank of major. When the war ended he returned to private practice in Hawaii.

Previous to his administration, Stainback was a United States District Attorney and then a judge on the U.S. District Court for the Territory of Hawaii.  He was appointed to the office by President Franklin D. Roosevelt. It is likely that his friendships with then-Secretary of State Cordell Hull and Senator Kenneth McKellar, both Tennesseans, played a role in his appointment. However, Stainback was essentially powerless for the first two years of his term since Gov. Joseph B. Poindexter had allowed the military to take over the government on December 7, 1941. During that time, Hawaii was governed by Army generals Walter Short,  Delos Emmons, and Robert C. Richardson, Jr.

A conservative Democrat, Stainback, whose full powers were restored on April 13, 1944, played a significant role in  the lifting of martial law in wartime Hawaii. Stainback believed Communists were plotting to take over the Hawaiian Islands. He also provided a genesis for Hawaii's Democratic Revolution of 1954 by decrying the land monopolies in Hawaii and calling for land reform. Upon resigning his post on May 8, 1951, Stainback had served eight years, eight months and six days, the longest of any appointed governor up to that point.

On September 26, 1951, he was appointed by President Harry S. Truman as an associate judge to the Hawaii Supreme Court. Stainback argued for Commonwealth status similar to Puerto Rico instead of statehood, arguing that Hawaii would benefit from the federal tax exemption.

Death and legacy
Stainback died in 1961 in Honolulu, Hawaii and is buried at Oahu Cemetery.

His son, Macklin Fleming, was an associate justice of the California Court of Appeal and an early opponent of affirmative action.

References

Governors of the Territory of Hawaii
Territory of Hawaii judges
Princeton University alumni
University of Chicago Law School alumni
1883 births
1961 deaths
Justices of the Hawaii Supreme Court
Hawaii Democrats
20th-century American judges
Burials at Oahu Cemetery
People from Somerville, Tennessee